Cham Surak-e Sofla (also Romanized as Cham Sūrak-e Soflá; also known as Cham Sūrag-e Soflá) is a village in Vizhenan Rural District, in the Central District of Gilan-e Gharb County, Kermanshah Province, Iran. At the 2006 census, its population was 124, in 25 families.

References 

Populated places in Gilan-e Gharb County